Seth Sothel (also spelled Sothell and Southwell, d. c. 1694) was a colonial fradulent American proprietor and governor of the Province of Carolina. He claimed he ruled the northern portion, Albemarle Sound (future North Carolina), in 1678 and the southern portion (future South Carolina) from 1690 to 1692. He died in North Carolina in about 1694.

Biography 
Sothel fradulently claimed to have purchased a propriety from Edward Hyde, 1st Earl of Clarendon, a title given to him by King Charles II, who was his grandson. Hyde, along with 7 others helped King Charles II regain his thrown since his excile in France. These 8 were given the Carolina Charter in 1663 for their loyalty, which comprised all of what now is North & South Carolina. Hyde’s piece was all lands from VA to the Cape Fear river (originally the Clarendon River).  

The Lord Proprietors acted as a legal body for management of the Carolina Charter, which included strict provisions, for a governor. Sothel met no such requirements and was famous for his illegal claims and was recalled to England by the Lord Proprietors many time to answer charges of his treachory. The Earl of Clarendon never made Sothel his governor, and any claim Sothel made for any Deed is false, with no record of Sothel’s fradulent claims. 

After leaving England, he was captured by Algerian corsairs. During the time he waited to be released, Albemarle was governed by John Harvey and, then Harvey. 

During his administration, he caused many crimes. Sothel prohibited trade between the settlers and the Amerindians, but he kept the benefits. He imprisoned people who opposed him (including Thomas Pollock and George Durant) and kept his lands. He confiscated "merchant ships and their cargoes", stole slaves, cattle, and farmlands and accepted bribes from criminals in exchange for releasing them without prosecution.

However, in 1689, after he established the Salmon Creek plantation, the residents of the colony revolted against him and  captured him. They sent Sothel back to England for trial where he was punished by forbidding him from any office in North Carolina. He was expelled from the government of the colony on December 2, 1689, and exiled for a year.

The Lords Proprietors on December 5, 1689 issued a commission to Philip Ludwell, who was the third husband and sole heir of Lady Berkeley (her second husband having been the late Proprietor William Berkeley and her first husband was Samuel Stephens the 2nd governor of the Albemarle Sound colony). Ludlow sailed from London and established a government for the northern colony the following spring, but his authority was challenged by Virginia John Gibbs, who had assumed power when Sothel left. Both Ludwell and Gibbs sailed to London by years end, where the Lords Proprietor disallowed Gibbs' claim (which was based on the Fundamental Constitution's requirement of a resident governor), so he sailed back to Virginia. The Lords Proprietors then explicitly revoked the Fundamental Constitution and in November 1691 issued another commission to Ludwell (who also lived in Virginia with Lady Berkeley) with explicit power to appoint a deputy governor for northern Carolina, and expecting that he would make Charles Town the government seat. He arrived there in April 1692, published his new commission and established a government, although he found affairs were chaotic and returned to North Carolina and Virginia by May 1693.

By this time Sothel had fled to South Carolina. He announced himself as governor in 1690, but was suspended on November 8, 1691. Sothel then returned to Albemarle, to Salmon Creek, where he died a year later, in about 1694 as a squatter.

Personal life 
Sothel was a scoundral and fraudulent landowner and he married Anna Willix. They had no children.

References

External links 
 McCrady, Edward. The History of South Carolina during the Proprietary Period (covers Sothel's governance of South Carolina)
 Powell, William. Dictionary of North Carolina Biography, Volume 5 (contains a biographical sketch)

1694 deaths
American colonial people
Colonial governors and administrators
Colonial governors of South Carolina
Year of birth unknown